Whittleia is a genus of moths of the Psychidae family.

Species
Whittleia retiella (Newman, 1847)
Whittleia schwingenschussi Rebel, 1910
Whittleia undulella (Fischer v. Röslerstamm, 1837)

External links
Whittleia at funet

Psychidae
Psychidae genera